In mathematics, parabolic cylindrical coordinates are a three-dimensional orthogonal coordinate system that results from projecting the two-dimensional parabolic coordinate system in the
perpendicular -direction.  Hence, the coordinate surfaces are confocal parabolic cylinders. Parabolic cylindrical coordinates have found many applications, e.g., the potential theory of edges.

Basic definition

The parabolic cylindrical coordinates  are defined in terms of the Cartesian coordinates  by:

The surfaces of constant  form confocal parabolic cylinders

that open towards , whereas the surfaces of constant  form confocal parabolic cylinders

that open in the opposite direction, i.e., towards . The radius  has a simple formula as well

that proves useful in solving the Hamilton–Jacobi equation in parabolic coordinates for the inverse-square central force problem of mechanics; for further details, see the Laplace–Runge–Lenz vector article.

Scale factors

Differential elements

The infinitesimal element of volume is

The differential displacement is given by:

The differential normal area is given by:

Del

Let  be a scalar field.  The gradient is given by

The Laplacian is given by

Let  be a vector field of the form:

The divergence is given by

The curl is given by

Other differential operators can be expressed in the coordinates  by substituting the scale factors into the general formulae found in orthogonal coordinates.

Relationship to other coordinate systems

Relationship to cylindrical coordinates :

Parabolic unit vectors expressed in terms of Cartesian unit vectors:

Parabolic cylinder harmonics 

Using the technique of the separation of variables, a separated solution to Laplace's equation may be written:

Since the  equation is separate from the rest, we may write

where  is constant.  has the solution:

The solutions to these equations are the parabolic cylinder functions

The combination will reduce the number of constants and the general solution to Laplace's equation may be written:

Applications

The classic applications of parabolic cylindrical coordinates are in solving partial differential equations, e.g., Laplace's equation or the Helmholtz equation, for which such coordinates allow a separation of variables.  A typical example would be the electric field surrounding a flat semi-infinite conducting plate.

See also 

 Parabolic coordinates
 Orthogonal coordinate system
 Curvilinear coordinates

Bibliography

  
  Same as Morse & Feshbach (1953), substituting uk for ξk.

External links
MathWorld description of parabolic cylindrical coordinates

Three-dimensional coordinate systems
Orthogonal coordinate systems